Jabir (Arabic: جابر ) is an Arabic surname or male given name, which means "comforter". Alternative spellings include Djābir, Jaber, Jābir, Gabir, and Geber. The name may refer to:

Given name
Jaber I Al-Sabah (1770–1859), Kuwaiti political leader
Jabir Al-Azmi (born 1970), Kuwaiti politician
Jabir al-Kaabi (1789–1881), Arabian political leader
Jabir al-Sabah (1926–2006), Emir of Kuwait
Jabir Herbert Muhammad (1929–2008), American businessman
Jabir Husain (born 1945), Indian politician
Jabir ibn Abd Allah (607–697), Arab companion of Muhammad
Jabir ibn Aflah (1100–1150), Spanish-Arab astronomer
Jābir ibn Hayyan (died c. 806–816), early Islamic alchemist
Jābir ibn Zayd (died 711), Arab theologian
Jabir Novruz (1933–2002), Azerbaijani writer
Jabir Raza (born 1955), Indian historian
Djabir Saïd-Guerni (born 1977), Algerian athlete
Jabir Shakir (born 1987), Iraqi football player
Sultan Djabir (c. 1855–1918), ruler of a region on the Uele River in what is now the Democratic Republic of the Congo.

Surname
Balla Jabir (born 1985), Sudanese football player
Fathi Jabir (born 1980), Yemeni football player
Malik Jabir (born 1944), Ghanaian football player

See also
Arabic name
Geber (disambiguation)
Jaber

References

Arabic-language surnames
Arabic masculine given names